Disney's Extremely Goofy Skateboarding is a video game developed by Krome Studios released in September 2001 for PC. Players are able to play as either Goofy who is voiced by Bill Farmer, or Max who is voiced by Jason Marsden, from the Disney animated TV series Goof Troop. Players can skateboard through four "worlds", which consist of three levels each.

The soundtrack for the game was devised by composer Jack Wall in early 2001.

Gameplay
There are several modes which comprise the game, including shred session, tech session, and other various tutorial modes. The player is able to play as Goofy or Max. There are also tutorials showing how to perform a trick. While playing the tutorial or the levels, Goofy or Max will provide commentary. The game features four worlds; each world has three levels or locations. A key is required to pass into the next level. The player is able to choose a skateboard before beginning the gameplay; each level has two objectives completing an objective will reward the player a key. Points will be rewarded for certain tricks performed. Some of the tricks are 50/50, nosegrind, unbelievable, kickflip, etc.

Release
For a limited time, one could buy a box of Kellogg's cereal and receive a free demo CD-Rom entitled Disney's Extremely Goofy Skateboarding Preview. This demo included one level and several tutorials on how to land the tricks. One could also buy a pack of Perdue Dinosaur Chicken Nuggets, and receive a free full version of the game on CD-Rom.

References

External links

2001 video games
Goofy (Disney) video games
Goof Troop
Skateboarding video games
Krome Studios games
Windows games
Windows-only games
Disney sports video games
Video games about dogs
Video games based on animated television series
Video games developed in Australia
Video games scored by Jack Wall
Single-player video games